Blencow railway station was situated on the Cockermouth, Keswick and Penrith Railway between Penrith and Cockermouth in Cumberland (now in Cumbria), England. The station served the villages of Blencow (or Blencowe) and Newbiggin. The station opened to passenger traffic on 2 January 1865, and closed on 3 March 1952. It reopened temporarily on 2 July 1956 before closing permanently on 6 March 1972.

Possible alternative names for the station before it was opened were Newbiggin station and Dacre & Greystoke station
The station could not be named Newbiggin as there is another Newbiggin on the Carlisle - Settle Railway a few miles away.

References

 
 
 
https://web.archive.org/web/20061012184033/http://www.ckpr.fsnet.co.uk/BLENCOW.HTM

Disused railway stations in Cumbria
Former Cockermouth, Keswick and Penrith Railway stations
Railway stations in Great Britain opened in 1865
Railway stations in Great Britain closed in 1952
Railway stations in Great Britain opened in 1956
Railway stations in Great Britain closed in 1972
Beeching closures in England
Dacre, Cumbria